Clifton station is a limited-use Virginia Railway Express train station in Clifton, Virginia. The location serves as a station stop during special seasonal events in the town, most notably the town's annual Clifton Day. It is served by special Manassas Line trains running between Manassas station and Rolling Road station. A temporary platform is erected for when the station is in use.

References

External links
Clifton Seasonal VRE Station
Station from Clifton from Google Maps Street View

Clifton, Virginia
Virginia Railway Express stations
Former Southern Railway (U.S.) stations